Gianni Da Ros (born 26 August 1986, in Pordenone) is an Italian professional road bicycle racer who rode one season for UCI ProTour team .

On Wednesday 11 March 2009, Da Ros was arrested by Italian police investigating the trafficking of banned doping products.

On 23 November 2009, he was handed a record 20-year ban from the National Anti-doping Tribunal for trafficking doping substances. This was later reduced to four years by the Court of Arbitration, with his ban ending in March 2013.

References

External links
Cycling New Roundup 30 August 2008
Italian team for Down Under
Giani Da Ros Profile

1986 births
Living people
People from Pordenone
Italian male cyclists
Cyclists from Friuli Venezia Giulia